Tang Jiali (born July 13, 1976, in Hefei, Anhui) is a Chinese dancer and model who became a celebrity and household name in the China in 2003 by being the first woman to sell books of nude artistic photographs of herself since the lifting of many of the previous restrictions on distribution and sale of such photographs.

In 2002, Tang Jiali published a book named The Bodyart Portray of Tang Jiali, which includes full-frontal nude pictures of her own. Later, in 2004, she published another two books, Bodyart Photographs of Tang Jiali and Portray of Tang Jiali, both contain nude pictures of herself, some are even more arousing than previous book.

See also
 Muzi Mei

External links
 http://www.danwei.org/archives/001394.html
 http://www.beijingportal.com.cn/7838/2004/01/03/1380@1802394.htm
 https://web.archive.org/web/20051224091108/http://bjyouth.ynet.com/article.jsp?oid=3264667
 Website (in Chinese and partially English)
 People's Daily (people.com.cn) (in Chinese)

1976 births
Living people
Chinese female models
People from Hefei
Beijing Dance Academy alumni